The BBC News at One is the afternoon/lunchtime news bulletin from the BBC. Produced by BBC News, the programme is broadcast on BBC One and the BBC News channel (via British Sign Language) from Monday to Sunday at 1:00pm for 30 minutes, although a shorter bulletin can be broadcast on the weekend. The programme is currently presented by Ben Brown, Jane Hill and Reeta Chakrabarti.

The BBC News at One achieved an average reach of 2.7 million viewers per bulletin in 2007, making it the most watched programme on UK daytime television. During the COVID-19 pandemic, audiences reached 4.2 million viewers in 2020.

History

The One O'Clock News launched on 27 October 1986 as part of the new daytime television service on BBC1. It replaced News After Noon programme, which had a two-person presentation team of Richard Whitmore and either Moira Stuart or Frances Coverdale. Martyn Lewis, who had joined the BBC from rival ITN, was the original presenter of the new One O'Clock News, in a single-presenter format. Michael Buerk took over as main presenter in October 1987 when Martyn Lewis left to present the Nine O'Clock News. Philip Hayton acted as main relief presenter from when the programme began, and took over as main anchor in  October 1988 when Michael Buerk left to present the Nine O'Clock News along with Martyn Lewis in a single-presenter format. Martyn Lewis and Michael Buerk, the main anchors of the Nine, along with Anna Ford, acted as relief presenters during this period.

A unified look across BBC news output was introduced on 13 April 1993 from N2, and the programme, while retaining the One O'Clock News title, adopted the Silicone graphics computer look, which distorted the image into Virtual Reality, a real studio did exist with changeable panels behind the newsreaders, dependent upon the bulletins, made up of three one metre, three 1.5-metre, and three x three-metre panels, these being kept in storage racks in N2. The programme still kept some of its individuality, such as a reworked version of the theme music, again by George Fenton, with the newer version being performed by the BBC Concert Orchestra at Abbey Road studios. John Tusa and Edward Stourton took over as main presenters at this time. Tusa left the bulletin in 1996, with Stourton taking over as main presenter, and Justin Webb becoming deputy presenter a year later. Anna Ford, who would later become lead anchor of the programme, would also occasionally stand in as presenter.

According to the TV studio history website, N1, was the former World Service studio next door to N2, were both closed around 1998/1999 when the new News Centre opened in Stage 6, understanding – becoming the "property" of BBC Resources, which renamed N1 to TC10 and N2 to TC11, and that Recourses could not afford to refurbish them. Both studios were unused for a couple of years.

A new look across all of BBC News television output on 10 May 1999 meant that for the first time all the main bulletins on BBC One had the same look, the only exception being the title of the programme. At this time Anna Ford took over as the main presenter of the bulletin in 1999, staying until her retirement from newsreading in April 2006. George Alagiah became deputy presenter at the same time until early 2002 when he became the presenter of BBC Four News. Darren Jordon took over from George Alagiah as deputy presenter until late 2006. Following Ford's retirement, Sophie Raworth became lead anchor.

On 22 January 2007, the programme titles were relaunched, along with the rest of the BBC television output, to give an identical series of titles across news programming on all BBC channels.

Between February and August 2008, Kate Silverton took over as main presenter while Sophie Raworth was on maternity leave. After this Kate Silverton became deputy presenter.

On 4 February 2008, the programme temporarily moved studios, from N6 to N8 (the former BBC News 24 studio), as part of restructuring across BBC News. On 21 April 2008 the programme underwent a graphical refresh and returned to the refurbished N6, and was now known as the BBC News at One.

On 5 November 2010, during the National Union of Journalists strike action, former Sky News and GMTV presenter Emma Crosby presented the programme whilst the regular presenters were absent. Further strike dates occurred on 15 July 2011 and 1 August 2011 plus on 28 March 2013. Gavin Grey presented on these days in addition to BBC News Channel.

On 18 March 2013, the programme moved to Broadcasting House, along with the BBC News channel and the other BBC One bulletins, and began broadcasting in high-definition. The programme was the first to be broadcast from the new studio.

Between January and June 2015, the bulletin was extended to 40 minutes due to the length of the English regional bulletins being reduced to 5 minutes during the general election campaign period. Scotland, Wales and Northern Ireland retained the original 30-minute broadcast length and aired their regular 15-minute bulletins.

From 23 March 2020, Simon McCoy took the role as the Monday-Wednesday presenter, following the end of the BBC's Afternoon Live, Jane Hill continued to present on Thursdays, with her sharing the role on Fridays with Kate Silverton. Raworth ceased to present the bulletin and appeared exclusively as a main anchor of the BBC News at Six and BBC News at Ten.

On 25 March 2021, Simon McCoy left the BBC after 17 years at the network. He presented his final BBC News at One on the same day. Since McCoy's departure, the programme has dispensed with a main presenter, with a team of established BBC journalists presenting the programme on rotation.

Presenters

Current presenters 

In addition, Huw Edwards or Sophie Raworth occasionally present in the event of a major news story.

Former presenters
Presenters below are occasional or relief presenters unless indicated otherwise.

 Martyn Lewis (Main presenter, 1986–1987)
 Michael Buerk (Main presenter 1987–1988)
 Philip Hayton (Main presenter, 1988–1993)
 John Tusa (Main presenter, 1993–1996)
 Edward Stourton (Main presenter, 1993–1999)
 Justin Webb (Main presenter, 1997–1999)
 Anna Ford (Main presenter, 1999–2006) 
 Sophie Raworth (Main presenter, 2006–2020)
 Simon McCoy (Main presenter, 2020–2021; relief presenter, 2008–2020)
 George Alagiah (Deputy presenter, 1999–2001)
 Darren Jordon (Deputy presenter, 2001–2006)
 Louise Minchin (Deputy presenter, 2006–2008; relief presenter 2008–2012)
 Kate Silverton (Deputy presenter, 2008–2015; relief presenter 2015–2021)
 Laurie Mayer (1986–1993)
 John Humphrys (1988–1996)
 Jennie Bond (1993–1999)
 Jill Dando (1993–1995)
 Sian Williams (2001–2013)
 Bill Turnbull (2003–2006)
 Natasha Kaplinsky (2005–2007)
 Emily Maitlis (2007–2013)
 Jon Sopel (2010–2014)
 Matthew Amroliwala (2012–2014)
 Joanna Gosling (2019–2022)
 Victoria Derbyshire (2021–2022)

One O'Clock News Hour
The BBC News at One has been shown on the BBC News channel since April 2006, making up the first half-hour of the BBC News at One. During the headlines and "coming up" section, BBC One viewers see a preview of the stories to come from their region, while BBC News viewers see sports headlines. Between 12:45 and 13:30 BBC News has a service providing in-vision British Sign Language for viewers with hearing difficulties. Within the last few minutes of each programme, a full national weather forecast is presented within the studio.

Between 2006 and 2017, significant differences could be seen between the two-halves of the programme, as the second half was originally presented by the Duty News Channel presenter. Since 2017, coinciding with schedule changes on the BBC News channel, the presenter of the BBC News at One has fronted the full one-hour slot.It also features an extended Sport Today and World Business Report. On 28 June 2021, a new regional round up called Across the UK was introduced looking at stories from the nations and regions.

See also

 ITV Lunchtime News

References

External links
 
 

1986 British television series debuts
1990s British television series
2000s British television series
2010s British television series
2020s British television series
BBC television news shows
British television news shows
BBC News